Chivas Regal is a blended Scotch whisky produced by Pernod Ricard in Scotland. The company was founded in 1786, with its home being in the Strathisla distillery at Keith, Moray in Speyside, Scotland, and is the oldest continuously operating Highland distillery.

Chivas Regal has been the market-leading Scotch whisky aged 12 years and older in Europe and Asia Pacific. Its sales grew by 61% between 2002 and 2008. In global terms, Chivas Regal recorded volume sales of 4.9 million nine-litre cases in 2012 and 2013, but sales decreased to 4.4 million cases in 2015. It has been the world's fourth best selling Scotch whisky since 2016.

Product line
Chivas Regal 12: Blended from whiskies matured for at least 12 years.
Chivas Regal Extra: a blend with a higher proportion of sherry casks.
Chivas Regal Extra 13: Blended from whiskies matured for at least 13 years. 
Chivas Regal 18: Blended from whiskies matured for at least 18 years. 
Chivas Regal 25: Created using whiskies aged at least 25 years; available only in limited quantities.
The Chivas Brothers' Blend: A 12-year-old blend intended to reflect the original Chivas house style, with a predominance of Speyside malts, in particular Strathisla and Longmorn.
Chivas Regal Ultis: A blended malt whisky containing no grain whisky.
Chivas Regal Mizunara: Originally released for the Japanese market in 2014. Part of the blend is matured in Mizunara oak casks. Made its debut in the US in Jan 2019.
Chivas Regal The Icon: Blended from whiskies matured for at least 25 years. Launched in 2015 initially as a Dubai Travel Retail exclusive. This blend is sold in a hand-blown Dartington Crystal decanter crafted from green glass.
Chivas Regal XV: Unveiled in 2018, Chivas Regal XV is a 15 year old blended Scotch whisky which has been finished in casks that previously held Grande Champagne Cognac.

History

Pre-1823: prior to legalisation of whisky distillation
Brothers James and John Chivas, born in 1810 and 1814 respectively, were two of fourteen children born to Robert and Christian Chivas, living on a remote Strathythan farm in the Ellon Parish of Aberdeenshire.

James joined William Edwards, who in 1828 had bought a grocery, luxury goods, wines and liquor emporium from the family members of John Forrest. Forrest had opened his store in 1801, but died in 1828. James became a partner in 1838. John began working at a wholesale footwear and apparel firm, DL Shirres and Co. This firm would be awarded distribution rights of Chivas Bros from 1860 to 1886, from around John Chivas' entry until James Chivas' death and again later.

Edwards died in 1841, and Charles Stewart took over. In 1843, Stewart and Chivas was granted a Royal Warrant to supply goods to Queen Victoria. In 1850, Stewart and Chivas was appointed Royal Grocer to the queen's mother, the Duchess of Kent, and many other Royal Warrants followed over the years. The huge advantage of getting a Royal Warrant was that upper class gentry followed royalty without a second thought, to be seen as both conformal and of cognizable status. This automatically resulted in a considerably increased footfall of the wealthy.

1823–1893: legalisation of whisky distillation and origins of whisky production
In Scotland, distilling whisky (uisge beatha in Gaelic) had been legalised in 1823, leading to a proliferation in the number of brands. Some were produced at 70–72% alcohol by volume (ABV), but the majority were at 60–65% ABV, imbibed after cutting with water. Arthur Bell defined a "fine whisky" as one that was sold at ~65% ABV. These were savoured after adding soda.

Vatting of whiskies within bond warehouses was legalised in 1853 by The Forbes-Mackenzie Act, and, with blending, the number of brands made available for sale increased overnight. During this period, Stewart and James Chivas decided to respond to their affluent customers' demands for better whisky, by blending select malts to create a proprietary blend. The firm's first blended malt Scotch whisky, the Royal Glen Dee, was launched in 1854. Stewart left in 1857, making way for John and the company could now be named Chivas Brothers. In 1863, they launched a proprietary blended Scotch whisky, a smoothly crafted blend of 10-year-old malt and grain whiskies, Royal Strathythan.

The May 8, 1890, edition of Scotland Magazine described Chivas Brothers as "undoubtedly the finest purveying business in the north of Scotland".

1893–present: post-Chivas family
The last Chivas family member involved in the business, Alexander, son of James, died in 1893. Control of the company thenceforth was exercised by the board of trustees; Alexander Smith, the right-hand man of Alexander Chivas; and their Master Blender, Charles Stewart Howard. In 1895, Smith and Howard offered to buy out the board of trustees and the female side of the family, removing any residual trace of Chivas family members. This proposal was accepted with the proviso that the company name would remain Chivas Brothers forever.

Chivas had agents assess market conditions in the US in the 1890s. The marketing team reported a booming economy which was looking for luxury. In 1900, Howard decided to create a new blend in memory of the founding brothers, James and John. Using the best malt and grain whiskies available in the market and inhouse, Howard blended a malt-dominated recipe. Introducing the term 'Regal', Howard created a 25 year old whisky in 1909 called Chivas Regal, the oldest Blended Scotch Whisky of its era, and launched it in the US, establishing it as the world's first and oldest luxury whisky.

It was all one way street then for Chivas Regal, from 1909 till mid 1915, during which period World War I started and became a sluggish, long-drawn affair (1914–18). Existing stocks were depleted quickly as demand outstripped supply. Shipping lanes to USA closed down, and Chivas Bros switched to building reserves at home.

Whisky Brokers Morrison & Lundie bought the company in 1936, and decided that it was far too onerous to maintain aged barrels of whisky. They wound up the 20 YO Loch Nevis and reduced the production of the Chivas 25 drastically, resulting in its withdrawal as their standard-bearer and ultimate demise. They switched focus to a 12 YO heavily marketed 'premium' brand, a decision that would be seen as wise five years later, when World War II (1939-1945) broke out in Europe. 1939 saw the debut and continued success of Chivas Regal 12 YO Blended Scotch in the US at what was to become a global standard proof value of 75 degrees, i.e., 42.8% ABV. (The Americans mark it as 86 proof as they double the ABV to arrive at proof value.) Henceforth, quality, age (generally 12 years), cost (high), popularity (sales) and demography (high-end) would define a 'Premium' Scotch Whisky.

Chivas Regal was purchased by Seagrams in 1949, which enabled much wider distribution and marketing. Seagrams was owned by a Canadian Jew, Samuel Bronfman.  When the Middle East opened up as a market post oil domination/OPEC, Seagrams' products, including Chivas Regal, were banned in the entire Arab controlled area in the early 1960s. Chivas would limp back nearly four decades later, when under Pernod Ricard, but rise rapidly thereafter to its leading position in the Asia Pacific area.

In 1950, the firm bought Milton (Miltown) distillery, renaming it Strathisla, which is the brand's home in Keith to this day. Its product, Strathisla single malt, is a key malt component of the blend.

In 1997, the Chivas Regal range was expanded with the launch of much older whiskies like the Chivas Regal 18 year old, and in 2007 the new Chivas Regal 25. Other expressions followed, like the Mizunara in 2014, The Icon in 2015 and the XV in 2018.

Pernod Ricard acquired Chivas Regal in 2001.

Strathisla distillery

Strathisla distillery in Speyside is home to Chivas Regal and its visitor centre. Founded in 1786 as Milton/Miltown distillery, it is the oldest working distillery in the Highlands of Scotland. The Strathisla single malt is the core malt whisky in all Chivas Regal blends, buttressed by malts from Longmorn, The Glenlivet, Allt-a-Bhainne, Miltonduff Distillery and Braes of Glenlivet (now Braeval) among other distilleries, and grain from Strathclyde distilleries in the Lowlands.

Awards
Chivas Regal whiskies have performed well at international spirit ratings competitions. In 2013, the San Francisco World Spirits Competition jury awarded its Double Gold Medals to the Chivas Regal 18yr, 21yr and 25yr whiskies.

San Francisco World Spirits Competition annual ratings

In popular culture and sponsorships
In the 1973 film The Exorcist, the character Father Dyer brings this whisky for Father Karras to drink after the death of his mother. They share it and he remarks "Chivas Regal! Where'd you get the money for it—out of the poor box?"

It was a favourite whiskey of the journalist and novelist Hunter S Thompson.

1975 film The Prisoner of Second Avenue, Jack Lemmon orders a bottle of Chivas Regal in a liquor store after having his apartment robbed.

In Only Fools And Horses Series 2, episode 3, A Losing Streak, first broadcast in 1982 Delboy asks for a 'Large Chivas Regal' at the bar to try and impress Boycie.

In Risky Business (1983) Joel Goodson (played by Tom Cruise) pours a glass of Chivas Regal and Coca-Cola after returning home from dropping his parents off at the airport.

Players of Dungeons and Dragons and other Role Playing Games have long favored the cloth bag that Chivas Regal comes in for carrying polyhedral dice.

The Beastie Boys song Brass Monkey, released in 1987, includes the lyric "we don't mind Chivas".

In Working Girl, from 1988, savvy New York City receptionist Tess McGill played by Melanie Griffith orders a "Chivas" during an engagement party for her friend Cynthia (Joan Cusack), immediately prior to a proposal from her boyfriend Mick Dugan played by Alec Baldwin.

In the 1993 film Mrs. Doubtfire, Daniel and Jonathan drink shots of Chivas during their business dinner at Bridges.

Kelly Clarkson's 2007 album My December includes a hidden track entitled "Chivas". The track is about an ex she ran into at a bar while drinking Chivas.

In the Mad Men season 6 episode, "The Better Half", Ted Chaough compares Fleishchmann's margarine to Chivas Regal (because it's a relatively expensive brand of margarine), while Don Draper compares it to Budweiser (because he compares margarine to butter).

In the American Dad! season 6 episode, "Spring Break-Up", Roger (as "Scotch Bingington") invites Spring Breakers to party at the Smith household. As the self-proclaimed "King of Spring Break," he has a staff that dispenses Chivas Regal.

In the House of Cards season 3 episode "Chapter 29", First Lady Claire Underwood orders "Two Chivas, neat" during a scene in the White House.

British rapper M.I.A. namedrops Chivas Regal in her song "Teqkilla". At the time, M.I.A.'s fiance was Benjamin Bronfman, who belonged to the family that owned Seagrams.

In 2011, Chivas Regal sponsored The Asian Awards Outstanding Achievement in Sports Category.

Chivas Regal signed a three-year sponsorship deal with the British Premier League football team Manchester United in August 2018. As a follow up in October 2019, it created a special Manchester United-themed 13-year-old blended Scotch whisky in honour of former team manager Sir Alex Ferguson. Partly matured in ex-rye casks, this expression was created exclusively for the US where Manchester United reportedly has over eight million fans.

The launch of Chivas 13 Manchester United edition follows that of a similar release in Australia in August 2019, viz., Chivas Extra 13 American Rye, a 13-year-old Australia-exclusive blend finished in ex-rye whisky casks.

The Chivas Regal Ultis 1999 Victory Edition: a 20 year old Blended Malt bottled in 2019, using single malts of 1999 vintage from the Strathisla, Longmorn and Braeval distilleries, in tribute to Manchester United winning The Treble (the Premier League, FA Cup and the European Cup in the same season) in 1999.

References

External links

Chivas Regal
Strathisla Distillery, home of Chivas Regal
Whisky Distilleries
Strathisla Distillery
Pernod Ricard Parent Company Homepage
Proof66.com Chivas Regal 18-Year Summary Page 
Proof66.com Chivas Regal 21-Year Summary Page 

1801 establishments in Scotland
1801 introductions
British Royal Warrant holders
Economy of Moray
Pernod Ricard brands
Blended Scotch whisky
Scottish brands